Little J & Big Cuz is an Australian animated television series first screened on the NITV network in 2017. The 13-part series is directed by Tony Thorne and produced by Ned Lander and developed with The Australian Council for Educational Research. It was written by Beck Cole, Jon Bell, Erica Glynn, Danielle MacLean, Bruce Pascoe and Dot West, with creative input from Margaret Harvey, Leah Purcell and Adrian Wills.

In May 2018, the show was renewed for a second series to air on NITV and ABC Kids in 2019. The series won the 2018 Logie Award for Most Outstanding Children's Program.

Plot
Little J is five and has just started school. His older female cousin, Big Cuz, is ten. They are a couple of Aboriginal Australian kids living with their Nanna and Old Dog, who also narrates. The gaps in Nanna's ramshackle fence lead to Saltwater, Desert and Freshwater Country. With the help of Nanna and their teacher Miss Chen, Little J and Big Cuz are finding out all about culture, community and country.

Educational value 
Designed as a school readiness initiative, the series was accompanied by the publication of educational resources designed for preschool and early years teachers. In 2018, educational researchers reviewed the use of Little J and Big Cuz in early childhood, preschool and junior primary settings, producing a series of case studies about the use of the series as a transition to school resource. The research was funded by the Dusseldorp Forum.

Versions 
22 episodes are available in various Aboriginal languages, including:

 Djambarrpuyngu
 Pitjantjatjara
 Arrernte 
 Walmajarri
 Yawuru
 Palawa kani
 Gija
 Warlpiri
 Noongar

Cast
 Miranda Tapsell as Little J
 Deborah Mailman as Big Cuz
 Ningali Lawford-Wolf as Nanna
 Aaron Fa'aoso as Old Dog
 Ursula Yovich as Levi
 Shari Sebbens as Sissy/B Boy
 Renee Lim as Miss Chen
 Mark Coles Smith as Mick
 Katie Beckett as George/Jacko
 Kylie Farmer as Ally
 Miah Madden as Monti

References

External links
 
Education studies
 

National Indigenous Television original programming
2010s Australian animated television series
2017 Australian television series debuts
Animated television series about children
Australian children's animated adventure television series
Australian preschool education television series
Animated preschool education television series
2010s preschool education television series